Jack’s Stir Brew Coffee is a coffeehouse chain with seven locations in and around New York City. The first location, in the historic Greenwich Village on W. 10th Street, was opened by owner Jack Mazzola in 2003. It was the first Organic, Fair Trade, Shade-Grown coffee shop in the city. The coffee is prepared using the house-created Stir Brew method. Jack's Stir Brew retails Organic Coffee and Vegan baked goods.

History 
 2002 - 2003 Jack invents and patents the Stir Brewer
 2003 - Jack’s 10th Street opens in New York City
 2005 - Jack’s Front Street opens in South Street Seaport
 2011 - Jack’s Amagansett opens its permanent year round location in Amagansett Square. This store expands the offerings of the Jack’s Experience by introducing the Marketplace and a custom vintage clothing line
 2012 - Jack’s Front Street is destroyed in Hurricane Sandy
 2013 - Jack’s Downing Street opens and begins distributing baked goods to all Jack's locations
 2014 - Happy Jack clothing line launched in Amagansett
 2016 - Jack's opens two new locations; one in Sag Harbor, NY and a second inside the Roxy Hotel in New York City

Brewing Technique 

Jack's Stir Brew Coffee uses a method of coffee preparation that involves a patented machine. The 'Stir Brew' technique is a standard drip coffee process, that also agitates the coffee grounds throughout the drip process. The act of agitation, or turbulence, when brewing drip coffee is not particularly novel, however the creation of a machine to automatically conduct this process is unique. Proponents describe the resulting coffee as smoother and richer in flavor than standard drip coffee. The 'Stir Brewer' is a custom coffee machine which automatically agitates the grounds.

Acclaim 

Jack’s has been voted best cup of coffee by New York Magazine, as well as named the top cup of coffee in the country by AOL Digital City.  Food & Wine Magazine listed Jack’s as one of the top coffee shops in the country, and Time Out New York named it Best Indie Coffeehouse.

Locations 
Manhattan

 10th Street - 138 West 10th Street, New York, NY 10014
 Reade Street - 139 Reade St., New York, NY 10013
 Tribeca - 2 6th Ave. (Avenue of the Americas), New York, NY 10013
 Hudson Yards - 20 Hudson Yards, New York, NY 10001

Long Island

 Amagansett- 146 Montauk Hwy, Amagansett, NY 11930
 Sag Harbor - 51 Division St., Sag Harbor, NY 11963

New Canaan, CT

 New Canaan- 96 Main St., New Canaan,CT 06840

References

External links 
 Jack's Stir Brew Official Website
 "Jack's Strange Brew" by Annie Karni, Downtown Express, June 2006
 "The House That Jack Built by Lesley Michael, Healthy Living NYC, August 2005
 "An Obsessives Guide to Coffee" by Ray Isle and Lily Barberio, Food & Wine, March 2006
 Jack’s Stir brewing up celebrity regulars

Coffeehouses and cafés in the United States
Food and drink companies based in New York City